Codonanthopsis caribaea is a species of flowering plant in the family Gesneriaceae. This species is native to Guadeloupe to North Venezuela, and is a epiphyte and mainly grows in wet tropical biomes. Codonanthopsis caribaea, along with other species in its genus, was first published in 2013.

References

Gesnerioideae